Adotela frenchi is a species of ground beetle in the subfamily Broscinae in the genus Adotela. The species was described in 1890.

References

Beetles described in 1890
Broscini